PDZ and LIM domain protein 7 is a protein that in humans is encoded by the PDLIM7 gene.

The protein encoded by this gene is representative of a family of proteins composed of conserved PDZ and LIM domains. LIM domains are proposed to function in protein–protein recognition in a variety of contexts including gene transcription and development and in cytoskeletal interaction. The LIM domains of this protein bind to protein kinases, whereas the PDZ domain binds to actin filaments. The gene product is involved in the assembly of an actin filament-associated complex essential for transmission of ret/ptc2 mitogenic signaling. The biological function is likely to be that of an adapter, with the PDZ domain localizing the LIM-binding proteins to actin filaments of both skeletal muscle and nonmuscle tissues. Alternative splicing of this gene results in multiple transcript variants.

Interactions 

PDLIM7 has been shown to interact with TPM2.

References

Further reading